Hakan Kutlu (born 14 January 1972) is a Turkish football manager and former player. As a player, he played as a central defender and was a long time captain of Ankaragücü.

He is one of the one-club men in Turkey. Kutlu retired as a player in August 2007 after spelling 28 consecutive years for the club from the youth team on and he started working as a sportive director at the same club.

Kutlu returned to Mersin IY on 6 January 2016 but was in the club lesser than 24 hours, before he left the job again.

Managerial stats
Last updated 3 May 2012

References

External links
 

1972 births
Living people
Turkish footballers
MKE Ankaragücü footballers
Turkish football managers
Süper Lig managers
Denizlispor managers
Association football defenders
People from Amasya
Kasımpaşa S.K. managers